Alexandre Le Siège (born 18 August 1975), also known as Alexandre Lesiège, is a Canadian chess player who holds the FIDE title of Grandmaster. He has won three Canadian championships and represented Canada in World Championship qualifying events and Olympiads.

He was born in Montreal, Quebec, he was first introduced to chess at age six. He began playing in local events organized by Chess 'N Math, and had a Candidate Master rating by age 11. His first important success was winning the Canadian Junior Championship in 1989, at age 14.

Le Siège, at age 16, won the 1992 Canadian Chess Championship at Kingston, Ontario, defeating grandmaster Kevin Spraggett in the key game, and this made him the second-youngest Canadian champion ever, after Abraham Yanofsky, who was also 16 when he won in 1941. He was awarded the International Master title by FIDE, and qualified for the 1993 Interzonal Tournament at Biel, Switzerland.

He won the Canadian title again in 1999 at Brantford. and in 2001 at Montreal with a tie-break match held in Brantford. He earned his Grandmaster title at the 1999 Quebec Open in Montreal, his third and final required title norm. This made him the first Canadian Francophone to earn the highest title in chess. He represented Canada in Olympiad Team Chess events, twice on top board, with success.

Le Siège was virtually retired from competitive chess from 2004 to 2015 when he started playing again by defeating Grandmaster Evgeny Bareev in a rapid match 1.5-0.5. He subsequently was a member of the Canadian Olympiad team and won the Quebec and Canadian International opens.

In 2022, Le Siège was elected to the Canadian Chess Hall of Fame.

References

External links
 
 
  
 
 
 

1975 births
Living people
Canadian chess players
Chess grandmasters
Sportspeople from Montreal